Panagiotis "Takis" Ikonomopoulos (born 19 October 1943) is a Greek former international football player who played as a goalkeeper. He was nicknamed "The Bird" after his impressive dives he did during his career.

Career
In 1963, a month after coach Stjepan Bobek arrived at Panathinaikos, Ikonomopoulos was transferred to the club from Proodeftiki.

While playing for Panathinaikos, he managed to not concede a single goal for 1,088 minutes (in a span of 13 consecutive games—a record for Greece which remains unbroken). The record spanned from 17 January 1965 until 9 May 1965. His record places him in spot number 19 in the World's Top Division Goalkeepers of all time with the longest time without conceding a goal (the second highest for Greece, ranking at world spot 38 is Vasilis Konstantinou of Panathinaikos who went 988 minutes without giving up a goal, from 30 December 1979 until 16 March 1980). He was a member of the squad that reached at the 1971 European Cup Final. He played the whole European competition using the shirt of his idol José Ángel Iribar, legendary keeper nicknamed "El Txopo" from Athletic Bilbao and the Spanish national team, which he got from a Spain-Greece game in 1970.

Ikonomopoulos had set up a gym at home and used to put extra hours of training there. One of the boys who used to hang out and watch the bird train was Giannis Kyrastas.

Besides Proodeftiki and Panathinaikos, Ikonomopoulos also played for Panachaiki and Apollon Athens before he retired in 1979.

After retiring as a football player, he went on to work with Panathinaikos as a goalkeeping coach.

In 2002, Takis Ikonomopoulos became responsible for coaching Panathinaikos' first team during the four last matches of the season—after coach Sergio Markarian had been barred from entering any stadium for 40 days following an incident with Olympiakos.

Honours

Panathinaikos
Alpha Ethniki: 1963–64, 1964–65, 1968–69, 1969–70, 1971–72
Greek Cup: 1966–67, 1968–69

References

External links

World's Top Division Goalkeepers of all time with the longest Time without conceding a Goal

1943 births
Living people
Association football goalkeepers
Panathinaikos F.C. players
Panathinaikos F.C. non-playing staff
Apollon Smyrnis F.C. players
Proodeftiki F.C. players
Panachaiki F.C. players
Greece international footballers
Footballers from Athens
Greek footballers